Rhododendron groenlandicum (bog Labrador tea, muskeg tea, swamp tea, or in northern Canada, Hudson's Bay tea; formerly Ledum groenlandicum or Ledum latifolium) is a flowering shrub with white flowers and evergreen leaves that is used to make a herbal tea.

Description 
The leaves are wrinkled on top, densely hairy white to red-brown underneath, and have a leathery texture, curling at the edges. The tiny white flowers grow in hemispherical clusters and are very fragrant and sticky.

Distribution and habitat 
It is reported from Greenland, as well as from every province and territory in Canada and in the northeastern and northwestern United States (New England, New York, Pennsylvania, Michigan, Wisconsin, Minnesota, Idaho, Washington, and Alaska).

It grows in bogs, muskegs, and open tundra, as well as occasionally on wet shores and rocky alpine slopes.

Toxicity 
The plant contains toxic alkaloids which are poisonous to livestock and may be toxic to humans in concentrated doses.

Uses 

The leaves are regularly used to make beverages and medicines—most commonly a fragrant tea—by many Native American tribes such as the Quinault and Makah, the Potawatomi, the Anishinaabe, the Iroquois, and First Nations tribes in Canada. When European explorers arrived, they soon adopted these uses as well, dubbing it "Indian plant tea". During the American Revolutionary War, it was used as a substitute for tea.

It is sometimes grown as an ornamental shrub.

Its essential oil is popular in aromatherapy.

See also
Rhododendron (disambiguation)
List of Rhododendron species
List of rhododendron diseases
List of Award of Garden Merit rhododendrons

References

External links

USDA PLANTS database: Ledum groenlandicum
Description of Rhododendron groenlandicum at the American Rhododendron Society
Photograph of Rhododendron groenlandicum plus description at the Washington Native Plant Society
Rhododendron groenlandicum at the Connecticut Botanical Society

groenlandicum
Herbal tea
Flora of Greenland
Flora of Alaska
Flora of Canada
Flora of Alberta
Flora of the Northeastern United States
Flora of Europe
Flora of the Western United States
Flora of the Great Lakes region (North America)
Flora of the United States
Flora without expected TNC conservation status